Smallcounty or ‘’’Small County’’’ is a historical barony in County Limerick, Ireland. Settlements in the barony include Hospital, Herbertstown, Fedamore, Knockainy, and Six-Mile-Bridge.

Location
Located in County Limerick, the barony of Smallcounty is bordered by six other baronies:
 Clanwilliam (County Limerick), to the north,
 Coonagh, to the north-east,
 Clanwilliam (County Tipperary), to the east,
 Coshlea, to the south
 Coshma, to the west, the ancient territory of the Uí Fidgenti clan
 Pubblebrien, to the north-west

Legal context
Baronies were created after the Norman invasion of Ireland as subdivisions of counties and were used for administration. While baronies continue to be officially defined units, they have been administratively obsolete since 1898. However, they continue to be used in land registration and specification such as in planning permissions. In many cases, a barony corresponds to an earlier Gaelic túath which had submitted to the Crown.

History
‘’An Déis Bheag’’ was the name of a tribe from late Antiquity. The English form of the barony’s name may have been based on this name
This barony lay partly in the Poor law union of Kilmallock, and partly in that of Limerick. In 1846, the total number of tenements valued was 2942.
 

Some officers of the Regiment of the Lord President of Connaught, Sir Charles Coote, were rewarded for their services in the Cromwellian wars with land in the barony. They are listed as Col. Chidley Coote, Col. Richard Coote, Major Ormsby, Major King and Captain St. George. The land was rated at £800 per 1000 acres - the second highest in the county. 
In 1831, the population was 22,674; in 1841 it was 21,527. The 1841 census shows how families in the barony were employed.

.

Civil parishes
There are 18 civil parishes in the barony.

The following civil parishes are wholly contained within the barony:
Ballinard
Ballinlough
 Ballynamona
Cahircorney
Glenogra
Hospital A house of the Knights Hospitaller gave its name to this place. The house had been established by 1215.
 Kilcullane
Kilfrush
Knockainy (i.e. the hill of Áine).

The barony also contains parts of the following civil parishes:
Athneasy 
Ballycahane
Fedamore
 Kilbreedymajor  (or Kilbreedy Major) 
Kilpeacon
Kilteely (This parish is one half of the ecclesiastical parish of Kilteely-Dromkeen. The Dromkeen part is a civil parish in its own right in the neighbouring barony of Clanwilliam.)
Monasternenagh
Tullabracky
Uregare.

External links
  Source given is "Ordnance survey".

References
From :

From other sources:

Baronies of County Limerick